Zenthoefer Furs were an amateur U.S. soccer club which played in St. Louis, Missouri during the late 1940s and early 1950s.

They had played as a junior squad named Schumachers in the 1947-48 season where they fell short of national honors when they lost in the final round of the National Junior Cup to Lighthouse Boys of Philadelphia. The Zenthoefers turned senior the next season. Under the guidance of manager George E. McGann they made their way to the 1949 National Amateur Cup final losing to SC Elizabeth by a 6-1 score.  They also lost to the Chicago Polish-Americans 5-1 in the 1949 National Challenge Cup quarterfinals.  In 1951, they won the St. Louis Major League by ten points over St. Louis Simpkins-Ford.  In 1952, they entered the American Soccer League of St. Louis.

Defunct soccer clubs in Missouri
Soccer clubs in St. Louis